James Armstrong (born 24 July 1944, Belfast) is a guitarist from Northern Ireland.

Armstrong's musical career started while he was still a schoolboy, when he played in Belfast's top showband, The Melotones, who were resident in the city's Romano's Ballroom. Armstrong played and recorded in the mid-'60s with Van Morrison and Them, touring both Europe and America (where he lived – playing and recording – for 4 years). Of the 51 tracks recorded by Morrison and Them (1964–66), Armstrong played on over half, and while living in America met and played with Jim Morrison & The Doors, Captain Beefheart and Frank Zappa. During this time he was voted 3rd best guitarist in the world (after Jimi Hendrix & Frank Zappa).

After leaving Them in 1969 Armstrong again teamed up with vocalist Kenny McDowell (who had replaced Van Morrison) in Sk'Boo, alongside Ricky McCutcheon and Colm Connolly. Then he and McDowell (born Kenneth McDowell, 21 December 1944, in Belfast, Co Antrim) formed the band Truth (1969–71) in Chicago with bassist Curtis Bachman (ex The Buckinghams) and drummer Reno Smith (ex Baby Huey & the Babysitters). They also added ex-Them keyboards/vibes/flute/sax player Ray Elliott (born Raymond Elliott, 13 September 1943, in Belfast, Co Antrim). In the late '70s, after playing with McDowell in Spike, Jim Armstrong was guitarist with Northern Irish rock outfit Light. Armstrong and his 'Light' bandmate Brian Scott also played in a brief 'Them' tour of Germany in 1979. In the '80s Amstrong and McDowell performed with a reformed Sk'Boo. It was with Sk'Boo that he regularly played Belfast's Errigle Inn.
 
At home in Northern Ireland where he worked for the civil service, he was a sought after session musician, and has been involved in many locally produced records and projects with Ulster Television, BBC Television and other radio stations. After touring for 9 years with one of the many incarnations of 'Them – The Belfast Blues Band' in the '90s with Eric Wrixon (the person who gave 'Them' their name, but never toured with the original band), he formed the Jim Armstrong Band with Scottish singer and harp player Jim Gilchrist, bass player Ali McKenzie (ex Belfast Blues Band) and drummer Siggi Heilek (ex Belfast Blues Band). He has played a huge variety of music in his time but blues is his main love. He is currently (2015) living in Las Vegas having moved to the USA following a health glitch when touring with his Jim Armstrong Band in Germany.

Discography

Them
Them Again (January 1966, Decca Records (U.K.); April 1966, Parrot (U.S.); CD reissue 1990, Polygram)
Call My Name / Bring 'em on In (March 1966, Decca Records)
Richard Cory / Don't You Know (May 1966, Decca Records)
Dirty Old Man (At The Age of Sixteen) / Square Room (August 1967, Sully Records 1021)
Walking in the Queen's Garden / I Happen To Love You (November 1967, Ruff Records 1088)
Dirty Old Man (At The Age of Sixteen) / Square Room (December 1967, Tower Records; newly-recorded versions of both tracks)
Walking in the Queen's Garden / I Happen To Love You (December 1967, Tower Records 384; re-issue of Ruff Records 1088)
Now and "Them" (January 1968, Tower Records; CD reissue 2003, Rev-Ola Records)
But It's Alright / Square Room (April 1968, Tower Records 407; 'B' side edited version of album track)
Time Out! Time in For Them (November 1968, Tower Records; CD reissue 2003, Rev-Ola Records)
Waltz of the Flies / We've All Agreed To Help (1969, Tower Records 461)
Corina / Dark Are The Shadows (March 1969, Tower Records 493)

Truth
Of Them & Other Tales (1995, Epilogue Records; recorded in 1969-1970)

Light
The Break / Castles in the Sand (1978, Mint Records CHEW 21)
Light (1979, Mint Records MINT 11) 
Dry Your Eyes / Turn Out The Light (1980, Shock Rock SRS 501)

Sk'Boo
It's A Hard Road / Music Is Life / Talking Pictures-God's Peace in Mind (1982, Cuecomber Records CUE 1001)

Them – The Belfast Blues Band
Live in Europe '96 (1997, BBB; only sold at live shows)
Them 2000 (2001; only sold at live shows)

Jim Armstrong Band
Live in Belfast (2003; only sold at live shows)
100% X VOL (2005; only sold at live shows)

Notes
Jim owned a 1959 Gibson Les Paul bought in America touring with Them in 1968 now owned and used frequently by Mike McCready of the Grunge rock group Pearl Jam.

References

External links
 See extract from Irish Folk, Trad and Blues: A Secret History by Colin Harper and Trevor Hodgett
 Jim Armstrong playing in the legendary Pound Club Belfast late seventies.
 'Light' at Irish Rock Discography
 'Sk'Boo' at Irish Rock Discography

1944 births
Living people
Musicians from Belfast
Guitarists from Northern Ireland
Van Morrison
Them (band) members